The Lupo family was a family of court musicians in England in the 16th and 17th centuries. "Lupo", Italian for "Wolf", was often used as a surname by Jews in Gentile society. Per Holman, "It must have appealed to them as a suitably ironic name for a persecuted people who were often likened to wolves in the mythology of the time."

Ambrose, son of Baptist from "Castello maiori" and "Busto in Normandy, in the republic of Malan", arrived from Venice in November 1540. On 26 April 1542 "ambrosin(o) de myllano" witnessed the will of former court musician John Anthony whose name is ultimately recorded in the probate records as "Anthonii Moyses". Two days later, Ambrose's name is recorded as "Ambrosius deolmaleyex" in the probate records, an apparent attempt by an English clerk to render the Jewish name "de Olmaliach" or "de Almaliach" ("Almaliach" being a form of the Sephardic name "Elmaleh").
Documents of State Archive in Venice are giving now evidence that Ambrose was appointed as player of violone "sonadore de lironj (or de lirinj)" at the Scuola Grande of San Marco in Venice from 1542 to 1549. The members of the group he belonged were all from the Lombardy region (Brescia and Salò), and they included:

– Antonio de Bortholomeo da violeta da Salò;

– Bartolomeo, father of Antonio, replaced by Cornelio in 1544.

– Cornelio (who died in Istria in 1550) began playing at the Scuola in 1541. He was the son of Jacomo lauter;

– Antonio caleger (fl. 1536–1549) resident of the Contrada S. Maria Formosa, a shoemaker and player at the Scuola from 1536;

– Batista de Caro da Sallò;

– Battista de (Zan) Maria de Sallò, was replaced by Lorenzo samiter (retailer of silk fabric) in 1544.

Ambrose's two sons, Peter and Joseph, were said to have been born in Venice. They joined the musicians guild in London 17 January 1555 and 20 August 1557. Joseph was appointed to the violin consort by warrant dated 16 November 1563; Peter, 20 September 1567. Ambrose, Peter and Joseph all served as court musicians for at least 40 years.

Joseph's son, Thomas, was appointed to the violin consort by a warrant dated 4 May 1591; Peter's son, Thomas, 17 November 1599.

Ambrose was a paid musician at the coronation of Edward VI, the burial of Henry VIII, and the coronation of Elizabeth I. Joseph, Peter, Thomas Sr. and Thomas Jr. were paid musicians at the funeral of Elizabeth I. Thomas Sr., Thomas Jr. and Horatio were paid musicians at the funeral of James I.

Family tree

See also
 Jews in England

References

Bibliography
Holman, Peter. Four and Twenty Fiddlers: The Violin at the English Court, 1540–1690 (Oxford University Press, USA, 14 March 1996)
 Pio, Stefano. " Viol and Lute Makers of Venice 1490 -1630" Ed. Venice research 2012. 

Show business families of Italy
English families
British families of Italian ancestry
Show business families of the United Kingdom
Lupo family